Tareq Mohammed Abdullah Saleh (born 1970) is a Yemeni military commander and the nephew of the late President Ali Abdullah Saleh. His father was Major General Mohammed Abdullah Saleh. Prior to the national crisis beginning in 2011, he headed the elite Presidential Guard. In 2012, he was ordered to stand down from this position. On 10 April 2013, he was appointed as a military attaché to Germany in an effort to remove the remnants of the previous regime. He re-emerged as a commander in the Houthi-Saleh alliance when the Yemeni Civil War broke out in 2015. When this alliance collapsed in 2017, Tareq Saleh commanded troops loyal to his uncle. Prior to the collapse of the pro-Saleh forces, the Saudi-owned Al Arabiya reported that negotiations were ongoing to form a military council in Saleh-held areas, which would have been headed by Tareq. Following his uncle's death, reports emerged that the younger Saleh had also been killed. However, these were never confirmed, and Houthi forces launched a manhunt. Saleh evaded capture and eventually resurfaced in the Hadi loyalist-held Shabwah Governorate.

References

Yemeni military officers
Yemeni military personnel of the Yemeni Civil War (2014–present)
1970 births
Living people
People from Sanaa
Saleh family
Presidential Leadership Council
21st-century Yemeni politicians